Bidar railway station (Station code: BIDR) is located in Bidar district in the Indian state of Karnataka and serves Bidar.

History
The Great Indian Peninsula Railway extended its Mumbai–Solapur line to Raichur in 1871. The Wadi–Secunderabad line was built in 1874. The Vikrabad–Bidar  broad gauge line was opened in 1932.

Construction of the 110-km Gulbarga–Bidar link was completed and inaugurated by Prime minister Narendra Modi on 29 October 2017.

Amenities
Bidar railway station has a Tourist Information Centre, computerized reservation counter,  waiting room, light refreshment stall and tea stall . Bidar has connectivity with Bengaluru, Pune, Hyderabad, Sainagar Shirdi, Latur, Aurangabad, Nanded, Kalburgi, osmanabad, and Mumbai (according to Railway Budget 2014–15)

References

External links
Trains at Bidar
 

Railway stations in Bidar district
Secunderabad railway division
Railway stations opened in 1932
Bidar
Railway stations in Karnataka